Euthydemus (Greek: Εὐθύδημος) may refer to:

People
Euthydemus, a fleet commander for Athens during the Sicilian Expedition, 415 to 413 BC
 Euthydemus, a 5th century sophist who features in Plato's Euthydemus
 Euthydemus, a son of Cephalus is mentioned in Plato's Republic
 Euthydemus, a son of Diocles is mentioned in Xenophon's Memorabilia
Euthydemus I (3rd century BC), ruler of the Greco-Bactrian Kingdom
Euthydemus II (2nd century BC), ruler of the Greco-Bactrian Kingdom
Euthydemus (tyrant) (3rd century BC), tyrant of Sicyon

Dialogues
Euthydemus, a dialogue by Plato